Agaram is a neighbourhood of Perambur and a developed residential area in North Chennai, a metropolitan city in Tamil Nadu, India.

Location
Agaram is located near (Kolathur, Chennai), Peravallur and Perambur. It is well connected by train and bus transport. It is very close to Perambur Loco Works Railway Station and Moolakadai Junction and Retteri Junction.

Neighborhoods
Periyar nagar.
Peravallur.
TVK nagar.
Jawahar nagar.
Villivakkam.
Kolathur, Chennai.
Sembium.
Perambur.

Roads and Streets
Jawahar nagar Main roads.
Off Paper mills road.
SRP koil street (Sundararaja Perumal koil street).
Sundararaja Perumal koil street (North)
Sundararaja Perumal koil street (South)
Kanakar street.
Ballard street.
Moorthy street.
Palavayal street.
Chidambaram street.
T.A. koil street (Thanthoni Amman koil street)
Loco scheme Colony.

Transport

Bus transport
Metropolitan Transport Corporation, Chennai, buses ply across Agaram, to and fro the places mentioned above. And also the following are well connected with road transport facilities.
Puratchi Thalaivar Dr. M. G. Ramachandran Central railway station.
Egmore Chennai railway station.

Rail transport
Connectivity to the following railway stations is appreciated.
Perambur Carriage Works railway station.
Perambur Carriage Works railway station.
Perambur railway station.
Puratchi Thalaivar Dr M. G. Ramachandran Central railway station.
Egmore Chennai railway station.

Places of Worship

Temples
Shri Sundararaja Perumal (SRP)temple, Kanakar street.

Shri Thanthontri Amman temple, T.A. koil street.
Shri Kothandaramasamy temple, T.A. koil street.
Shri Radha Rukmani sametha Kannabiran temple, Thulukkaanaththu Amman koil street.
Shri Brahmapureeshwarar temple, Palavayal street.
Shri Prasanna Venugopalaswamy temple, Palavayal street. 
Shri Prasanna Vinayagar temple, Palavayal street.
Shri Mahalakshmi Amman temple, Palavayal street.
Shri Prasanna Balasubramaniya swamy temple, Palavayal street.

References

Neighbourhoods in Chennai